Julia Caesar may refer to
Any of the women of the Julii Caesares
Julia Caesar (television), reporter for BBC News (TV channel)
Julia Cæsar (1885–1971), a Swedish actress